Kaberle is a surname. Notable people with the surname include:

František Kaberle (born 1973), Czech ice hockey player
František Kaberle, Sr. (born 1951), Czech ice hockey player
Tomáš Kaberle (born 1978), Czech ice hockey player